Meteorite Men is a documentary reality television series featuring meteorite hunters Geoff Notkin and Steve Arnold. The pilot episode premiered on May 10, 2009. The full first season began on January 20, 2010, on the Science Channel. The second season premiered November 2, 2010, and season three began November 28, 2011. Professors and scientists at prominent universities including UCLA, ASU, UA, Edmonton, and other institutions, including NASA's Johnson Space Center, are featured.

Summary
The show follows two meteorite hunters, Steve Arnold and Geoffrey Notkin, as they travel around the world scouring the Earth's surface for meteorites.

Arnold's background lies primarily in business, while Notkin is a passionate collector and science writer. In the pilot episode of Meteorite Men, Notkin and Arnold travel to the farmlands of Brenham, Kansas, where Arnold located and recovered the largest oriented pallasite ever found.

Meteorite Men has won two bronze Telly Awards. The show has also spawned a modern-day "gold rush" as thousands of amateur meteorite hunters now scour the globe each year in search of meteorites.

Notable finds

The World's Largest Oriented Pallasite
Some of the specimens found on the show were sold to collectors, while others were donated to university collections.

In October 2009, Arnold and geologist Philip Mani located and recovered the largest oriented pallasite ever found, in Brenham, Kansas, using a metal detector he created himself and a unique mapping technique. This is the location where the Meteorite Men pilot was filmed. The pallasite was on display at the Tucson Gem & Mineral Show in 2006. The pallasite has been exhibited at:
The Fort Worth Museum of Science and History (2006)
The Exploration Place in Wichita, Kansas (2006 & 2007)
Kansas City Union Station (2007)
Center for Earth & Space Science Center in Tyler, Texas (2011)
U.S. Space and Rocket Center, Space Mania, Tel Aviv, Israel (2013)
Space Center Houston (NASA) (2015)

Morasko, Poland
The discovery of these specimens below the depth of previously recorded finds suggested that further, more detailed surveys should be conducted with improved metal detecting equipment. Furthermore, the larger specimen was found embedded in a Miocene clay, which proves that it fell at that exact spot and was not transported by glaciers, disproving an earlier theory.

Episodes

Season 1 (2010)

Season 2 (2010)

Season 3 (2011–12)

Cultural impact
Meteorite Men has been cited as a possible reason behind the spike in interest regarding meteorites and meteorite hunting in the early 2010s. Dr. Laurence Garvie of the Center for Meteorite Studies at Arizona State University has stated that after his appearance on the show, he and his colleagues received about a half-dozen boxes of rocks each week from viewers who believed they had found a meteorite.

The Sterley pallasite
In approximately 1950, a farmer came across a 1,724.8 gram mass while plowing a field. The specimen, which displayed regmaglypts and fusion crust, was not fully classified until 2012, when the son of the finder, after watching Meteorite Men, took the specimen to Dr. Laurence Garvie at the Center for Meteorite Studies, ASU, for further analysis. The entire mass was then acquired by Ruben Garcia of Mr. Meteorite and Geoffrey Notkin of Aerolite Meteorites and Meteorite Men.

Steve Curry incident
In 2012, Detective Ryan Piotrowski of the Grand Junction Police Department charged Steve Curry with misdemeanor theft and fraud for selling false meteorites. Piotrowski had seen Meteorite Men and became intrigued by the case when it landed on his sergeant's desk.

References

External links
Official website of the Meteorite Men
Official Meteorite Men Facebook page
Meteorite Men YouTube Page
Head Rush: Cool Jobs in Science featuring the Meteorite Men
Almost Rocket Science podcast interview with the Meteorite Men
Geoff Notkin Official Blog
Steve Arnold Space Fest

2009 American television series debuts
2012 American television series endings
2000s American reality television series
2010s American reality television series
2000s American documentary television series
2010s American documentary television series
Science Channel original programming
Collecting